William N. Belter (July 7, 1926 – December 12, 1999) was an American lawyer, businessman, and politician. He represented Green Lake and Waushara counties in the Wisconsin State Assembly from 1953 to 1957.

Biography

Born in Wausau, Wisconsin, Belter graduated from high school in Wautoma, Wisconsin. He then received his bachelor's degree from University of Wisconsin and his law degree from University of Wisconsin Law School. He practiced law in Wautoma, Wisconsin. He was a real estate broker and a bank director and then president. Belter was a justice of the peace and was district attorney for Waushara County, Wisconsin from 1968 to 1977. He was also the attorney for Ed Gein during his 1968 trial in Waushara County for the murder of Bernice Worden. (Judge Robert H Gollmar 1968).

Belter also served in the Wisconsin State Assembly as a Republican from 1953 to 1957, after unsuccessfully seeking the Republican nomination for Assembly in that district in 1948 and 1950.  He was defeated in the 1956 Republican assembly primary.

In 1982, when it seemed no other Republican was willing to challenge incumbent Bronson La Follette, the party attempted to recruit Belter to run for Wisconsin Attorney General.  He consented to the run, but the Party ultimately did not collect enough signatures to put his name on the ballot, and he received a small number of write-in votes in the election.

Electoral history

Wisconsin Assembly (1948-1956)

| colspan="6" style="text-align:center;background-color: #e9e9e9;"| Primary Election

| colspan="6" style="text-align:center;background-color: #e9e9e9;"| General Election

| colspan="6" style="text-align:center;background-color: #e9e9e9;"| Primary Election

| colspan="6" style="text-align:center;background-color: #e9e9e9;"| General Election

| colspan="6" style="text-align:center;background-color: #e9e9e9;"| Primary Election

| colspan="6" style="text-align:center;background-color: #e9e9e9;"| General Election

| colspan="6" style="text-align:center;background-color: #e9e9e9;"| Primary Election

| colspan="6" style="text-align:center;background-color: #e9e9e9;"| General Election

| colspan="6" style="text-align:center;background-color: #e9e9e9;"| Primary Election

| colspan="6" style="text-align:center;background-color: #e9e9e9;"| General Election

Wisconsin Attorney General (1982)

| colspan="6" style="text-align:center;background-color: #e9e9e9;"| Primary Election

| colspan="6" style="text-align:center;background-color: #e9e9e9;"| General Election

Notes

1926 births
1999 deaths
Politicians from Wausau, Wisconsin
People from Wautoma, Wisconsin
University of Wisconsin–Madison alumni
University of Wisconsin Law School alumni
Wisconsin lawyers
Businesspeople from Wisconsin
County officials in Wisconsin
Republican Party members of the Wisconsin State Assembly
20th-century American businesspeople
20th-century American politicians
20th-century American lawyers